Ustia is a village in Glodeni District, Moldova.

References 

Villages of Glodeni District